John McLean (1877 – 1958) was a Scottish footballer who played as a defender (capable of playing at left or right back, which in that era were the most withdrawn positions on the field). He played for Vale of Leven, at that time playing outwith the Scottish Football League, for seven years before joining Liverpool in May 1903. He played four English Football League matches early in the 1903–04 campaign, but the team failed to win any of these games and he was dropped (the results did not improve, however, and the club was relegated at the end of the season); he then left to join Motherwell in June 1904. McLean spent six years as a regular at Fir Park before returning to Vale of Leven for one further season.

His younger brother Robert was also a footballer.

References

Notes

Scottish footballers
Liverpool F.C. players
1877 births
1958 deaths
Date of death missing
Vale of Leven F.C. players
Motherwell F.C. players
English Football League players
Scottish Football League players
Association football defenders
People from Bonhill
Footballers from West Dunbartonshire